Star Lake is a lake in Vilas County, Wisconsin, United States. Visitors have access to the lake from public boat landings. The community of Star Lake, Wisconsin is located on the lake's northeast shore. Fish species enzootic to Star Lake include bluegill, largemouth bass, muskellunge, northern pike, smallmouth bass, and walleye.

External links
Star Lake at Lake-Link.com

Lakes of Wisconsin
Lakes of Vilas County, Wisconsin